Ada (ZIP code 57644) is a rural township in Perkins County, South Dakota, with a population of 557.

References

Townships in Perkins County, South Dakota
Townships in South Dakota